St. Charles is a city in Winona County, Minnesota, United States. The population was 3,735 at the 2010 census.

History
St. Charles was laid out in 1854, and named for Saint Charles Borromeo (1538–1584), an Italian saint and cardinal. A post office has been in operation at St. Charles since 1855. St. Charles was incorporated in 1870.

The city was evacuated on April 17, 2009, when a large fire at North Star Foods, a poultry processing plant, threatened anhydrous ammonia tanks. Residents were allowed to return the next day.

Three properties in St. Charles are listed on the National Register of Historic Places: the 1874 Trinity Episcopal Church, the 1876 St. Charles City Bakery, and the 1890s Whitewater Avenue Commercial Historic District.

Geography and transportation

U.S. Highway 14 bisects the city from east to west, as does the Dakota, Minnesota and Eastern Railroad. Minnesota State Highway 74 goes through the city from south to north, running along Whitewater Avenue, also known as Main Street. A freeway entrance to Interstate 90 is immediately south of the city.

The Whitewater River runs through the northern part of the city.

Demographics

2010 census
As of the census of 2010, there were 3,735 people, 1,416 households, and 985 families living in the city. The racial makeup of the city was 91.8% White, 0.6% African American, 0.3% Native American, 2.5% Asian, 3.0% from other races, and 1.8% from two or more races. Hispanic or Latino of any race were 8.8% of the population.

There were 1,416 households, of which 36.4% had children under the age of 18 living with them, 55.7% were married couples living together, 10.1% had a female householder with no husband present, 3.7% had a male householder with no wife present, and 30.4% were non-families. 26.2% of all households were made up of individuals, and 12.5% had someone living alone who was 65 years of age or older. The average household size was 2.60 and the average family size was 3.15.

The median age in the city was 35.8 years. 28% of residents were under the age of 18; 7.9% were between the ages of 18 and 24; 26.3% were from 25 to 44; 22.8% were from 45 to 64; and 14.9% were 65 years of age or older. The gender makeup of the city was 49.6% male and 50.4% female.

2000 census
As of the census of 2000, there were 3,295 people, 1,238 households, and 870 families living in the city. The racial makeup of the city was 91.62% White, 0.97% African American, 0.27% Native American, 3.61% Asian, 0.09% Pacific Islander, 2.70% from other races, and 0.73% from two or more races. Hispanic or Latino of any race were 4.95% of the population.

There were 1,238 households, out of which 37.8% had children under the age of 18 living with them, 58.1% were married couples living together, 9.2% had a female householder with no husband present, and 29.7% were non-families. 23.6% of all households were made up of individuals, and 11.6% had someone living alone who was 65 years of age or older.  The average household size was 2.61 and the average family size was 3.13.

In the city, the population was spread out, with 29.3% under the age of 18, 9.1% from 18 to 24, 28.9% from 25 to 44, 17.1% from 45 to 64, and 15.6% who were 65 years of age or older.  The median age was 33 years. For every 100 females, there were 95.1 males.  For every 100 females age 18 and over, there were 92.5 males.

The median income for a household in the city was $42,813, and the median income for a family was $50,375. Males had a median income of $31,653 versus $23,173 for females. The per capita income for the city was $17,727.  About 7.5% of families and 9.1% of the population were below the poverty line, including 11.5% of those under age 18 and 12.1% of those age 65 or over.

Education
St. Charles is part of the St. Charles Public Schools and houses both the elementary and St. Charles High School. There is also St. Charles Public Library.

Art and culture
The annual city festival is Gladiolus Days which is always held the weekend before labor day in August. It honors the late Carl H. Fischer, a local resident who developed many varieties of that flower.  Fischer created a business called Noweta Gardens which developed hundreds of different varieties of Gladiolus.  The community gained the title of "Gladiolus Capitol of the World".

Notable people
Erastus Milo Cravath (1833–1900), field secretary with the American Missionary Association, spent his last years at St. Charles
P/O Arthur Donahue (1913–1942), pilot who fought for the RAF and died during the Battle of Britain
George W. Kiefer (1891–1943), lawyer and Minnesota state legislator
Carl H. Fischer (1907–2005), floriculturalist
Brad Nessler, ESPN commentator

Images

References

External links

City Website

Charles Borromeo

Cities in Minnesota
Cities in Winona County, Minnesota
1854 establishments in Minnesota Territory